Bidaxsh (bidakhsh, also spelled Pitiakhsh; in Roman sources Vitaxa) was a title of Iranian origin attested in various languages from the 1st to the 8th-century. It has no identical word in English, but it is similar to a margrave, toparch and marcher lord. The etymology of the term is disputed, and it has been interpreted as literally meaning "the eye of the king," "second ruler" or "vice king." The word was borrowed into Armenian as Bdeašx (բդեաշխ), and into Georgian as Pitiaxshi (პიტიახში) and Patiaxshi (პატიახში).

The title was prominent in Armenia and Georgia, being used by the military governor of a province, and being the hereditary title of the dynasts of Gugark. The Armenian sources mention four bdeašxs in the Kingdom of Greater Armenia, who are referred to by different names. Those four were the bdeašxs of Nor Shirakan (New Siracene), Aghdznik (Arzanene), Tsopk (Sophene), and Gugark (Gogarene). According to Cyril Toumanoff, the bdeašxs of Armenia likely emerged in connection with the conquests of Tigranes the Great as viceroys tasked with protecting the newly conquered border territories.

References

Sources

Further reading 
 

Positions of authority
Sasanian military offices
Georgian military ranks of Persian origin
Iranian words and phrases